The Sault Ste. Marie Walk of Fame is a series of markers located throughout downtown Sault Ste. Marie, Ontario, Canada.  The Walk of Fame is a joint project between the city of Sault Ste. Marie and its Downtown Association, and honours those from the city or the Algoma District who have made outstanding contributions to the community or have made significant achievements in their chosen field(s) of work.  Inductees are added on an annual basis.

History
The genesis of the Walk of Fame was City By-Law 2002-193, passed by the Sault Ste. Marie City Council on September 9, 2002.  The by-law established a "Walk of Fame Program," to be operated by the city and the Downtown Association with the intent of honouring Sault Ste. Marie natives who have made significant contributions and outstanding achievements.  By extension, the Walk was viewed as a means of enhancing tourism in the city and attracting patrons to the Downtown shopping and business district.

The by-law established a committee to select annual inductees and, at the outset, determine a suitable location for the Walk.  The 8 committee members are appointed by the City Council for a 3-year term, and include the mayor, two city councilors, two representatives of the Downtown Association, two citizens at large, and one Chamber of Commerce representative.

Prospective names for the first set of Walk of Fame inductees were submitted by the general public to the city clerk's office in 2003.  From that pool of nominees, the Walk of Fame Committee selected an inaugural list of 10 inductees.  Those selections were then tabled until a suitable time and place to launch the Walk of Fame was determined.  The Walk of Fame was formally unveiled on September 30, 2006, with its first 10 honorees celebrated as part of the grand opening weekend of the Steelback Centre sports arena (the arena would be rechristened Essar Centre in 2008 and GFL Memorial Gardens in 2018).

From its 2006 unveiling until the mid 2010s, the Walk of Fame markers were embedded in the south sidewalk of Queen Street, north of the Essar Centre and adjacent Memorial Square.  By the mid 2010s, however, wear and tear caused by winter weather, snow removal, and other maintenance vehicles caused many of the stone-and-granite markers to become crumbled or otherwise severely damaged.  In August 2015, as part of a broader repair plan for Queen Street's sidewalks, the City Council voted to remove the markers from the sidewalk and place them in storage.

With the Walk of Fame's markers removed and its nomination process paused, the City Council spent 2016 and 2017 reviewing new options for the Walk, including replacing the stones with vinyl graphics, illuminated pillars, or aluminum markers on the Essar Centre facade.  By Spring 2017, another display concept was considered, one that would place new and existing markers in upright, see-through display cases located throughout downtown.  The concept would help preserve the condition of the marble markers, reduce replacement costs for the original stones (5 of those 38 markers were damaged beyond repair), provide year-round access and visibility, and allow for simple display expansion and signage when necessary.  This plan would eventually be approved by Council, and the restoration project's results were revealed to the public (with the assistance of original Walk inductee Roberta Bondar) on December 7, 2017.

In late 2021, the Walk of Fame was the subject of review by a city task force.  Concerns about the Walk at that time reportedly included the annual frequency of its induction process and whether it created redundancies with other civic awards offered by the City of Sault Ste. Marie.  Though no changes to the Walk project were known to have been made, the Sault Downtown Association recommended in a June 2022 meeting to continue the program, though Association members suggested combining Walk induction ceremonies with other civic award events (to give all the awards more visibility), as well as allowing visitors to access online information on Walk honourees via QR codes near the markers.

Requirements
The 2002 by-law that established the Walk of Fame also established ground rules for Walk inductees, some of which have been adjusted over the years:
Any inductee (or if it is a group, at least one member of that group) must have been born in either the City of Sault Ste. Marie or the Algoma District, or have lived in the City or District for a minimum of 12 months at any point in their lifetime.
The inductee must have, over a period of years, made an outstanding contribution to the community, or have achieved local, provincial, national, or international accolades in their chosen field of work. Such fields include but are not limited to academics, humanitarianism, medicine, science and technology, government or military service, business and industry, arts and entertainment, athletics or other competitive endeavors.
Nominations for inductees can be submitted by the general public, but must be received by the City Clerk's office no later than March 31 of the intended year of honour. (This date may vary, however; the 2012 deadline occurred on April 30.)
Nominations received at the City Clerk's office by the deadline are then considered by the Walk of Fame Committee for inclusion in that year's Walk of Fame inductee class.
No more than 10 inductees would be honoured in the Walk's inaugural year.
Until 2015, no more than 5 inductees could be honoured in any year after the inaugural year; from 2018 onward, the maximum number would be reduced to 2 inductees per year.
No person or group can be honoured more than once on the Walk.
The list of annual inductees must be announced to the general public; this is usually done in late May or early June.
Formal dedication ceremonies for the markers must be open to the public as well; prior to the Walk's restoration project, these ceremonies were usually conducted each autumn on the GFL Memorial Gardens grounds.

Markers and location
In the Walk of Fame's original concept, each inductee was immortalized on a 16-inch granite stone square.  Within each square was a marble maple leaf displaying the inductee's name and year of induction.  The markers were originally embedded in the sidewalk facing Queen Street, in front of the north end of the GFL Memorial Gardens and the adjacent Memorial Square.

The restored Walk project, which was formally unveiled in December 2017, features cabinets in four locations throughout Downtown Sault Ste. Marie:  the GFL Memorial Gardens, the Memorial Tower, the Art Gallery of Algoma, and a parkette at the corner of Queen and March Streets.  Each cabinet contains marble leafs that are either replacements for markers damaged at the original Queen Street location, restored markers from the original Walk (and removed from their granite squares), or markers for more recent inductees.  The double-sided steel cabinets (each can hold up to 12 markers) are mounted on concrete bases and also feature transparent protective covers, made from the polycarbonate Lexan, through which the markers can be viewed.

Inductees
Note: (P) indicates a posthumous induction

See also 
Sault Ste. Marie, Ontario
Algoma District, Ontario
GFL Memorial Gardens

Notes

References

External links 
Walk of Fame information from the City of Sault Ste. Marie

Sculpture gardens, trails and parks in Canada
Municipal parks in Ontario
Culture of Sault Ste. Marie, Ontario
Walks of fame
Tourist attractions in Algoma District
Halls of fame in Canada